Pasquale Macchi (9 November 1923 – 5 April 2006) was a Catholic archbishop and the private secretary to Pope Paul VI.

Born in Varese, Italy, Pasquale Macchi was ordained to the Catholic priesthood on 15 June 1946. On 10 December 1988, he was appointed to the Roman Catholic Territorial Prelature of Loreto by Pope John Paul II and was consecrated a bishop by Pope John Paul II on 6 January 1989. Archbishop Macchi retired on 7 October 1996.

See also

References

1923 births
2006 deaths
20th-century Italian Roman Catholic titular archbishops
Bishops in le Marche